Masakuni (written: ,  or ) is a masculine Japanese given name. Notable people with the name include:

, Japanese sumo wrestler
, Japanese daimyō
, Japanese footballer and manager

Japanese masculine given names